Patrick Connolly (born 23 September 1953) is an independent politician from County Monaghan in Ireland. He was a Teachta Dála (TD) for the Cavan–Monaghan constituency from 2002 to 2007.

A psychiatric nurse and part-time secretary of the Health Services Branch of the SIPTU trade union, Connolly was elected to Dáil Éireann at the 2002 general election as an independent, campaigning primarily around the defence of services of Monaghan general hospital. He joined with other independent TDs to form a Technical group in order to gain speaking rights in the Dáil. He lost his seat at the 2007 general election. After his defeat he stood for election to Seanad Éireann on the Labour Panel, but was not elected. He was elected to Monaghan County Council at the 2009 local elections and was re-elected in both 2014 and 2019.

In August 2020, Connolly was one of 81 people who attended a dinner in Clifden, County Galway organised by the Oireachtas Golf Society. The gathering took place contrary to public health advice that had been issued in response to the COVID-19 pandemic in the Republic of Ireland, and became a major political scandal. Additionally, Connolly had played golf in Cabo Roig, Spain, on 11 August, so he would have been at most eight days into the 14-day quarantine period which the Irish government required from people travelling from Spain.

References

 

1953 births
Living people
Members of the 29th Dáil
Independent TDs
Politicians from County Monaghan
Local councillors in County Monaghan